The Daecheong incident, also known as the Battle of Daecheong, was a skirmish between the South Korean and North Korean navies near the Northern Limit Line (NLL) on 10 November 2009 off Daecheong Island. The incident began at 11:27 am when a North Korean navy patrol boat crossed the NLL, which is not recognized by North Korea (DPRK). After two verbal warnings from South Korean naval units, one of the South Korean patrol boats fired a warning shot. In response, the North Korean boat began firing at the South Korean ship. A patrol boat from the DPRK was seriously damaged, with eight casualties while the navy of South Korea (ROK) sustained no casualties.

Engagement 
The incident began at 11:27 am when a North Korean navy patrol boat crossed the NLL, which is not recognised by the DPRK, followed by two verbal warnings from South Korean naval units. After one more warning announcement, one of the South Korean patrol boats fired a warning shot. In response, the North Korean boat began firing at the South Korean ship. This resulted in a short exchange of fire between the sides. The North Korean vessel expended approximately 50 rounds, and the South Korean craft returned fire with 200 rounds.

The Korean Central News Agency (KCNA), the official news agency of North Korea, accused the South Korean Navy of provoking the confrontation at the maritime boundary between the two Koreas. The DPRK news agency reported that:

Aftermath 
After the battle, South Korea claimed their patrol boat suffered only superficial damage (15 bullet marks on the ship's side) with no casualties, while the fire-gutted North Korean patrol boat was partially destroyed. A news agency in South Korea reported a rumor that North Korea suffered four casualties (1 killed / 3 wounded).  On the other hand, a defector said about 10 North Korean sailors were killed in action. The KCNA pressed South Korea to apologize.

See also 
 First Battle of Yeonpyeong
 Second Battle of Yeonpyeong
 ROKS Cheonan sinking

References 

2009 in international relations
2009 in North Korea
November 2009 events in South Korea
Conflicts in 2009
Naval battles involving South Korea
Naval battles involving North Korea
North Korea–South Korea relations
2009 in South Korea